is the title and protagonist of a manga and tokusatsu TV series created by Osamu Tezuka. The TV series, produced by P Productions and Krantz Films, was aired on Fuji TV from July 4, 1966, to June 26, 1967, lasting a total of 52 episodes.  It is the first color tokusatsu TV series in Japan, beating Tsuburaya Productions' Ultraman to the air by six days. The show later aired in the US, dubbed in English, as The Space Giants. Digital Manga crowdfunded the manga, and it is currently available for digital purchase on their Emanga site.

Basic plot
The alien invader Goa plots to conquer Earth. He first warns the Murakami family (father Atsushi, mother Tomoko, and son Mamoru) of their invasion, and demonstrates his powers by transporting them to a prehistoric jungle and destroying a Giant Dinosaur (in reality, Agon, the title monster of a Godzilla-like TV series) before their very eyes. But they will not agree to surrender to Goa, so hope comes in the form of Magma, an armored, golden giant with long hair and antennae. He and his human-sized wife Mol, both of whom were created by the wizard Earth (who indeed lives deep beneath the Earth), are sent to defend our world against Goa. They befriend Atsushi and Mamoru; the latter has touched Magma emotionally, as he wanted to have a child with his wife Mol, so Earth creates a duplicate of Mamoru, whom he names Gam, and who wears a white helmet, with built-in antennae, on his head. Earth gives Mamoru a whistle, with which he can call Gam (when blown once), Mol (when blown twice) and Magma (when blown thrice) in times of crisis. So when Goa unleashes his various daikaiju, chances are that Magma, Mol, and/or Gam will fly to the rescue.

Ambassador Magma
Ambassador Magma, despite his robot-like appearance, is not a true robot, but actually a living giant forged from gold. In fact, true to his original manga appearance, in the series pilot opening, Tetsuya Uozumi, the actor who played Magma, actually wore gold make-up on his face. But such difficulties as Uozomi's own face turning beet-red, drowning out the gold makeup, quickly arose. The solution proved to be an easy one; in all the show's subsequent episodes, Uozumi wore a golden human-like mask.

Magma, just like his human-sized wife Mol and son Gam, transforms into a giant rocketship. Indeed, he is considered one of the earliest transforming mecha, even before the anime super robot, Brave Raideen, which set the standard for the genre.

He also shoots rockets out of a panel located in his chest, and (as do Mol and Gam) shoots electrical bolts from his antennae.

English localization (The Space Giants)
The Space Giants is the English title of this series.  The show is most notable for its humanoid robot heroes who responded to crises by transforming into rockets to combat a wide variety of dinosaur-like space monsters, and faceless, ninja-like villains called Lugo men (人間モドキ ningen-modoki literally mock-human) whose corpses melted into oozing blob-like slime whenever they were killed.

The main conflict of the story involved an evil space villain named Rodak who continually tried to conquer Earth by sending a new dinosaur-like monster from deep space to attack Japan. The stories were generally resolved in two to four episodes, much like the BBC's Doctor Who, and a new monster would be found by Rodak to begin another two- to four-part struggle. Rodak's efforts were opposed by an ancient white-bearded wizard named Methusan (sometimes called Methuselah or Mathusem), aided by a trio of humanoid robots who were all capable of transformations from humanoid form into rocket forms.

The human interest in the story was a family of three: a boy named Mikko, his mother Tomoko, and his journalist father Ito Mura. The family became involved in the story due to the villain Rodak's desire to publish news of his presence to world media. The Mura family found themselves continually caught in the crossfire of monster attacks and harried by the Lugo men and Rodak's spies. A major sub-plot in the series developed when Mikko's mother was kidnapped by the Lugo men and held in uncertain conditions for a number of episodes.

In the first episodes, the robot team were a duo consisting of a  gold robot aptly named Goldar and his companion, a silver-clad humanoid female named Silvar. It was implied that they had been created by the wizard Methusan. Early in the series, the wizard Methusan completed the team to mirror the Mura family by creating a humanoid rocket-boy named Gam, in the image of Mikko Mura, complete with his trademark red-and-white sweater vest. All members of the robot team were capable of transforming into rockets identified respectively by gold, silver, and red-and-white color schemes. Each had bulb-tipped antennae protruding from their heads, capable of discharging directed blasts of gamma rays. Goldar and Silvar were capable of firing missiles from their chest cavities, but Silvar was only shown doing this once. A regularly featured plot device was Mikko's ability to summon the robots by blowing a special high-frequency whistle: once to summon Gam, twice to summon Silvar and three times to summon Goldar.

The show first aired in Japan on July 4, 1966, and its international title was Space Avenger (one episode was dubbed for international markets). Originally intending to title it Monsters from Outer Space, the entire series was dubbed into English by Bernard H. Schulman's Lakeside Television Company and syndicated to a limited number of U.S. television stations in early September 1970 (such as WSNS-TV in Chicago and WTAF-TV in Philadelphia), under the title The Space Giants. The show was not distributed widely to U.S. television stations until the late 1970s, when it became a staple of fledgling Superstation TBS afternoon programming. 52 episodes were made, each running 25 minutes. It was known in Spanish as Monstruos del Espacio and in some English-speaking countries as Space Avenger.

As of late January and early February 2017, Bernard Schulman still owned the North American television and home video distribution rights to The Space Giants, under his Lakeside Television banner. At that time, rumors continued to circulate that the series would be issued in Blu-ray and Digital HD format for the 50th Anniversary in 2016, exclusively produced and distributed through AnimeImages and Lakeside Television Company in a joint partnership for production and distribution.

Ambassador Magma makes a cameo appearance in the 2004 Astro Boy: Omega Factor game for the Nintendo Game Boy Advance, along with a number of other characters created by Osamu Tezuka.

English version name changes
Magma – Goldar
Mol – Silvar
Goa – Rodak
Atsushi Murakami – Ito "Tom" Mura
Tomoko Murakami – Tomoko Mura
Mamoru Murakami – Mikko Mura
Earth – Methusan
Atsuya Sekita – Kita
Modoki Men – Lugo Men

TV Series cast

1993 OVA series

A 13-episode OVA anime remake was produced in 1993. This series served as a retelling of the original series. The OVA was produced by Bandai Visual, Tezuka Productions and PLEX, and was directed by Hidehito Ueda.

Adaptations 
In 1979, American comic book publisher FBN (Fantasy Book Novels) Publications produced a comic book adaptation (written and drawn by Angel Gabriele and artist Richard Lynn) of the first four episodes of Ambassador Magma. In 1994, Gabriele did another Space Giants comic book one-shot published by Boneyard Press.

See also
List of Osamu Tezuka anime
List of Osamu Tezuka manga
Osamu Tezuka
Osamu Tezuka's Star System

References

External links
Episode list and summary
Series summary with episode list
Ambassador Magma manga at TezukaOsamu@World
Ambassador Magma anime at TezukaOsamu@World

1965 manga
1966 Japanese television series debuts
1967 Japanese television series endings
1993 anime OVAs
Fuji TV original programming
Japanese drama television series
Japanese television series with live action and animation
Manga adapted into television series
Mecha anime and manga
Osamu Tezuka anime
Osamu Tezuka characters
Osamu Tezuka manga
Shōnen Gahōsha manga
Shōnen manga
Tezuka Productions
Tokusatsu television series
1960s Japanese television series